Haenianthus is a genus of plants native to the Greater Antilles of the Caribbean. It contains 3 species:

 Haenianthus incrassatus (Sw.) Griseb. - Jamaica
 Haenianthus salicifolius Griseb. - Cuba, Hispaniola, Puerto Rico
 Haenianthus variifolius Urb. - Cuba

References

External links
Photo of herbarium specimen at Missouri Botanical Garden, isotype of Haenianthus salicifolius

Oleaceae genera
Oleeae